Ole Olsen Evenstad may refer to:

Ole Olsen Evenstad (born 1766), member of the Norwegian Parliament
Ole Olsen Evenstad (born 1775), member of the Norwegian Parliament